Sino–Arab relations, have extended historically back to the first Caliphate, with important trade routes, and good diplomatic relations. Since the establishment of the People's Republic of China (PRC), modern Sino-Arab relations have gotten significantly closer, with the China–Arab States Cooperation Forum (CASCF) helping the People's Republic of China and the Arab nations to establish a new partnership in an era of the growing globalization. As a result, close economic, political and military relations between the two sides have been maintained. From 2018, the relations became significantly warmer, with the PRC and the Arab countries exchanging state visits, establishing cooperation mechanism and providing support to each other.

Since 1990, no Arab country has official diplomatic relations with the Republic of China (ROC), although it is diplomatically represented in some nations via Taipei Economic and Cultural Offices.

History

Medieval Era
During the Tang dynasty, when relations with Arabs were first established, the Chinese called the Arabs 大食 (Dàyì or Dayi).  The Caliphate was called "Da Yi Guo" 大食國. The word is thought to be a transcription of Persian Tāzik or Tāzī, derived from a nisba of the Arab tribe Ṭayyiʾ.  The modern term for Arab is  阿拉伯 (Ālābó or Alabo).

The Arab Islamic Caliph Uthman Ibn Affan (r. 644–656) sent an embassy to the Tang court at Chang'an.

Arab sources claim Qutayba ibn Muslim briefly took Kashgar from China and withdrew after an agreement but modern historians entirely dismiss this claim.

The Arab Umayyad Caliphate in 715 AD deposed Ikhshid, the king the Fergana Valley, and installed a new king Alutar on the throne. The deposed king fled to Kucha (seat of Anxi Protectorate), and sought Chinese intervention. The Chinese sent 10,000 troops under Zhang Xiaosong to Fergana. He defeated Alutar and the Arab occupation force at Namangan and reinstalled Ikhshid on the throne.

Chinese General Tang Jiahui led the Chinese to defeat the following Arab-Tibetan attack in the Battle of Aksu (717). The attack on Aksu was joined by Turgesh Khan Suluk. Both Uch Turfan and Aksu were attacked by the Turgesh, Arab, and Tibetan force on 15 August 717. Qarluqs serving under Chinese command, under Arsila Xian, a Western Turkic Qaghan serving under the Chinese Assistant Grand Protector General Tang Jiahui defeated the attack. Al-Yashkuri, the Arab commander and his army fled to Tashkent after they were defeated.

Although the Tang Dynasty and the Abbasid Caliphate had fought at Talas, on June 11, 758, an Abbasid embassy arrived at Chang'an simultaneously with the Uyghur Khaganate envoys in order to pay tribute.

A Chinese captured at Talas, Du Huan, was brought to Baghdad and toured throughout the caliphate. He observed that in Merv, Khurasan, Arabs and Persians lived in mixed concentrations. He gave an account of the Arab people in the Tongdian in 801 which he wrote when he returned to China.

Arabia [Dashi] was originally part of Persia. The men have high noses, are dark, and bearded. The women are very fair [white] and when they go out they veil the face. Five times daily they worship God [Tianshen]. They wear silver girdles, with silver knives suspended. They do not drink wine, nor use music. Their place of worship will accommodate several hundreds of people. Every seventh day the king (Caliph) sits on high, and speaks to those below saying, ' Those who are killed by the enemy will be born in heaven above; those who slay the enemy will receive happiness.' Therefore they are usually valiant fighters. Their land is sandy and stony, not fit for cultivation; so they hunt and eat flesh.

This (Kufa) is the place of their capital. Its men and women are attractive in appearance and large in stature. Their clothing is handsome, and their carriage and demeanor leisurely and lovely. When women go outdoors, they always cover their faces, regardless of whether they are noble or base. They pray to heaven five times a day. They eat meat [ even] when practicing abstention, [for] they believe the taking of life to be meritorious.

The followers of the confession of the “Dashi” (the Arabs) have a means to denote the degrees of family relations, but it is degenerated and they don’t bother about it. They don’t eat the meat of pigs, dogs, donkeys and horses, they don’t respect neither the king of the country, neither their parents, they don’t believe in supernatural powers, they perform sacrifice to heaven and to no one else. According their customs every seventh day is a holiday, on which no trade and no cash transactions are done, whereas when they drink alcohol, they are behaving in a ridiculous and undisciplined way during the whole day.

An Arab envoy presented horses and a girdle to the Chinese in 713, but he refused to pay homage to the Emperor, said, he said "In my country we only bow to God never to a Prince". The first thing the court was going to do was to murder the envoy, however, a minister intervened, saying "a difference in the court etiquette of foreign countries ought not to be considered a crime." A second Arab envoy performed the required rituals and paid homage to the Emperor in 726 A.D. He was gifted with a "purple robe and a girdle".

There was a controversy between the Arab ambassadors and Uyghur Khaganate Ambassadors over who should go first into the Chinese court, they were then guided by the Master of Ceremonies into two different entrances. Three Da shi ambassadors arrived at the Tang court in 798 A.D. A war which was raging between the Arabs and Tibetans from 785 to 804 benefited the Chinese.

Products were traded by sea routes between China and Arabs.

According to Professor Samy S. Swayd Fatimid missionaries made their Dawah in China during the reign of al-'Aziz bi-Allah.

Military and political relations
One legend among Muslims in China said that China during the Tang dynasty exchanged 3,000 Chinese soldiers sending them to the Arabs and the Arabs in turn sent 3000 Arab Muslim soldiers to China.

In 756, 3,000 Arab mercenaries joined the Chinese against An Lushan A massacre of foreign Arab and Persian Muslim merchants by Tian Shengong happened during the An Lushan rebellion in the Yangzhou massacre (760), since Tian Shengong was defecting to the Tang dynasty and wanted them to publicly recognized and acknowledge him, and the Tang court portrayed the war as between rebel hu barbarians of the Yan against Han Chinese of the Tang dynasty, Tian Shengong slaughtered foreigners as a blood sacrifice to prove he was loyal to the Han Chinese Tang dynasty state and for them to recognize him as a regional warlord without him giving up territory, and he killed other foreign Hu barbarian ethnicities as well whose ethnic groups were not specified, not only Arabs and Persians since it was directed against all foreigners. The Tang dynasty recovered its power decades after the An Lushan rebellion and was still able to launch offensive conquests and campaigns like its destruction of the Uyghur Khaganate in Mongolia in 840-847. It was the Huang Chao rebellion in 874–884 by the native Han rebel Huang Chao that permanently destroyed the power of the Tang dynasty since Huang Chao not only devastated the north but marched into southern China which An Lushan failed to do due to the Battle of Suiyang. Huang Chao's army in southern China committed the Guangzhou massacre against foreign Arab and Persian Muslim, Zoroastrian, Jewish and Christian merchants in 878-879 at the seaport and trading entrepot of Guangzhou, and captured both Tang dynasty capitals, Luoyang and Chang'an.  A medieval Chinese source claimed that Huang Chao killed 8 million people. Even though Huang Chao was eventually defeated, the Tang Emperors lost all their power to regional jiedushi and Huang Chao's former lieutenant Zhu Wen who had defected to the Tang court turned the Tang emperors into his puppets and completed the destruction of Chang'an by dismantling Chang'an and transporting the materials east to Luoyang when he forced the court to move the capital. Zhu Wen deposed the last Tang Emperor in 907 and founded Later Liang (Five Dynasties), plunging China into the Five Dynasties and Ten Kingdoms period as regional jiedushi warlords declared their own dynasties and kingdoms.

Arab Caliph Harun al-Rashid established an alliance with China. The Abbasid caliph Abu Ja'far Abdallah ibn Muhammad al-Mansur (Abu Giafar) was the one who sent the mercenaries. Several embassies from the Abbaside Caliphs to the Chinese Court are recorded in the T'ang Annals, the most important of these being those of (A-bo-lo-ba) Abul Abbas, the founder of the new dynasty, that of (A-p'u-ch'a-fo) Abu Giafar, the builder of Bagdad, of whom more must be said immediately; and that of (A-lun) Harun al Raschid, best known, perhaps, in modern days through the popular work, Arabian Nights. The Abbasides or " Black Flags," as they were commonly called, are known in Chinese history as the Heh-i Ta-shih, " The Black-robed Arabs."

Trade
In Islamic times Muslims from Arabia traded with China. For instance, China imported frankincense from southern Arabia via Srivijaya.

20th century

The Republic of China under the Kuomintang had established relations with Egypt and Saudi Arabia in the 1930s. The Chinese government sponsored students like Wang Jingzhai and Muhammad Ma Jian to go the Al-Azhar University to study. Muslim pilgrims also made the Hajj to Mecca from China.

Chinese Muslims were sent to Saudi Arabia and Egypt to denounce the Japanese during the Second Sino-Japanese War.

The Fuad Muslim Library in China was named after King Fuad I of Egypt by the Chinese Muslim Ma Songting.

In 1939 Isa Yusuf Alptekin and Ma Fuliang were sent by the Kuomintang to Middle Eastern countries such as Egypt, Turkey, and Syria to gain support for China in the Second Sino-Japanese War. Others included Wang Zengshan, Xue Wenbo, and Lin Zhongming. The Hui Muslim Imam  also toured the Middle East to confront Japanese propagandists in Arab countries and denounce their invasion to the Islamic world. He directly confronted Japanese agents in Arab countries and challenged them in public over their propaganda. He went to British India, Hejaz in Saudi Arabia and Cairo in Egypt.

Egypt maintained relations until 1956, when Gamal Abdel Nasser cut off relations and established them with the communist People's Republic of China instead. Ma Bufang, who was then living in Egypt, then was ordered to move to Saudi Arabia, and became the Republic of China ambassador to Saudi Arabia.

Ambassador Wang Shi-ming was a Chinese Muslim, and the Republic of China ambassador to Kuwait. The Republic of China also maintained relations with Libya, and Saudi Arabia.

By the 1990s all Arab states cut off ties with the Republic of China and established ties with the PRC.

The relations between China and the Arab League as an organization officially started in 1956, yet it was in 1993 when the Arab League opened its first office in China, when then-Secretary-General Asmat Abdel-Meguid went to an official visit to Beijing. In 1996, the Chinese Communist Party (CCP) general secretary Jiang Zemin gave an interview to Abdel-Meguid during his visit to Egypt, and became the first Chinese leader to officially visit the Arab League.

21st century 

Adam Hoffman and Roie Yellinek of the Middle East Institute wrote in May 2020 that the outbreak of the COVID-19 pandemic, which spread from China to the Arab states, has set a complex dynamic in relations between the sides, created an opportunity for solidarity and assistance, and at the same time exacerbating present challenges.

15 of the 22 Arab League member states had backed the 2020 Hong Kong national security law at the United Nations, alongside 38 other countries.

There are 14 Confucius Institutes in the Arab world. Confucius Institutes are one of the major ways China invests soft power in the Arab countries and in the world. After 14 years of operation in the region, it can be said that the Institutes, as an instrument of Chinese soft power, have effectively penetrated the Arab world and are welcomed without significant criticism.

Sino-Arab Cooperation Forum 

In the opening ceremony of the Forum in 2004, Chinese foreign minister Li Zhaoxing said that the Arab world is an important force in the international arena, and that China and Arab countries enjoy a time-honored friendship, remarking "Similar histories, common objectives and wide-ranging shared interests have enabled the two sides to strengthen cooperation. No matter how the international situation changes, China has always been the sincere friend of the Arab world."

The Sino-Arab Cooperation Forum was formally established during CCP general secretary Hu Jintao's visit to the League's headquarters in January 2004. Hu noted at the time that the formation of the forum was a continuation of the traditional friendship between China and the Arab world and an important move to promote bilateral ties under new circumstances.

Li stated that "the establishment of the forum would be conducive to expanding mutually beneficial cooperation in a variety of areas."

"China has submitted four proposals. First, maintaining mutual respect, equitable treatment and sincere cooperation on the political front. Second, promoting economic and trade ties through cooperation in investment, trade, contracted projects, labor service, energy, transportation, telecommunications, agriculture, environmental protection and information. Third, expanding cultural exchanges. Finally, conducting personnel training," he said. 
Arab foreign ministers attending the meeting agreed that the formal inauguration of the forum was a significant event in the history of Arab ties with China. They submitted a variety of proposals on promoting Sino-Arab friendship and cooperation. 
At the conclusion of the meeting, Li and Arab League Secretary General Amr Moussa signed a declaration and an action plan for the forum. 
Li arrived in Cairo on Sunday evening for a three-day visit to Egypt, the last leg of a Middle East tour that has taken him to Saudi Arabia, Yemen and Oman.

The 2nd CASCF was held in Beijing in 2006, it discussed the Chinese proposal of a Middle east Nuclear-free, and the peace process between Palestinians and Israelis. while the 3rd SAFC is set to be held in Bahrain 2008

Comparison

The Joint Communiqué
One of the major Joint Projects involves the Environment, the AL and PROC signed the Executive Program of the Joint Communiqué between the Environmental Cooperation for 2008–2009

The League of Arab States and the Government of People's Republic of China signed the Joint Communiqué on Environmental Cooperation (referred to as the Joint Communiqué) on 1 June 2006. The Joint Communiqué is an important instrument that aims to deepen the regional environmental partnership between the two parties. Since the signing of the Joint Communiqué, the Chinese Ministry of Commerce and the Chinese Ministry of Environmental Protection have coorganized two environmental protection training courses in June 2006 and June 2007 respectively, in China.

In order to implement article 4 of the Joint Communiqué, both parties shall develop this Executive Program for 2008 and 2009. It aims to enhance the cooperation between the League of Arab States and China in the field of environmental protection, which is in line with the common aspiration of the two parties and their long term interests, and will help to promote the friendship between the two parties.

The two parties will try to involve relevant government departments and
sectors, and will actively promote and seek cooperation on the projects and
activities in the following areas:

01*Environmental Policies and Legislation
02*Biodiversity Conservation
03*Prevention and Control of Water Pollution, Waste Management and Control
of Other Kinds of Pollution
04*Cooperation on Combating Desertification and Managing Water Resources in
Arid Areas
05*Coordinating the Stand on Global Environmental Issues
06*Environmental Industry
07*Enhancing Environmental Education and Raising Public Awareness in
Environment
08*Other Projects that the two may develop and implement other projects of common interest after negotiating with relevant government departments and sectors.
09*Financial Arrangements
10*Final Provisions

This treaty was signed by Arab Ambassador Ahmed Benhelli Under secretary general Am Moussa's Approval, and Xu Qinghua Director General Department for International Cooperation, Ministry of Environmental Protection.

See also
Silk Road
Sino-Roman relations
China–Lebanon relations
Saudi Arabia–Taiwan relations

Notes

References

External links
1stmaroc.com

China
Arab League
Arab League